The 1900–01 Yale Bulldogs men's ice hockey season was the 6th season of play for the program.

Season
Yale finished second in Intercollegiate Hockey Association play but in the two-game series at the end of the year the Elis dominated Brown to claim their third consecutive championship.

The team did not have a coach, however, W.J. Hoysradt served as team manager.

Roster

Standings

Schedule and Results

|-
!colspan=12 style="color:white; background:#00356B" | Regular Season

References

Yale Bulldogs men's ice hockey seasons
Yale
Yale
Yale
Yale